Goodnight is a 1996 single by Babybird, released from the album Ugly Beautiful. The song originally appeared on Stephen Jones' solo album Fatherhood, which had been released the previous December (where it was spelled "Good Night"), but was later re-recorded with a full band after Babybird were signed to Echo Records. The single was a minor hit on the UK Singles Chart, peaking at #28.

Track listing
"Goodnight"
"July"
"Harry & Ida Swap Teeth"
"July 2"
"Girl with Money"
"Shellfish"

References

Babybird songs
Songs written by Stephen Jones (Babybird)
1996 singles
1996 songs
The Echo Label singles